Sharps (formerly, Griffin, Milden, Milden Village, Milden Wharf, Milton, Milton Wharf, Sharp's Wharf, and Sharps Wharf) is an unincorporated community in Richmond County, Virginia. It lies at an elevation of 30 feet (9 m).

References

Unincorporated communities in Richmond County, Virginia
Unincorporated communities in Virginia